David W. "Famous Dave" Anderson, best known as the founder of the Famous Dave's and Old Southern BBQ Smokehouse restaurant chains, is a former Assistant Secretary of the Interior for Indian Affairs in the George W. Bush administration. As Assistant Secretary, he had jurisdiction over the Bureau of Indian Affairs and the Office of Indian Education Programs (now the Bureau of Indian Education).  

Anderson is a Choctaw and Ojibwe Indian, and lives in Edina, Minnesota.  He was born in Chicago, Illinois, and grew up there as well as on reservations in Wisconsin. Famous Dave Anderson now travels the country speaking and is the author of several award-winning books.

Philanthropy
In 2001, Anderson and his family founded The LifeSkills Center for Leadership, a 501(c)3 which provided leadership experiences to at-risk and underprivileged Native American youths.

Personal life
Dave Anderson lives in Edina, Minnesota with his wife Kathy.  He has two kids, James (married to Colleen, née Bubb) and Tim, both residing in Minneapolis. His family still owns and enjoys property in Hayward, Wisconsin, beside the LCO Reservation.

References

Year of birth missing (living people)
Living people
Choctaw people
Ojibwe people
Businesspeople from Chicago
Harvard University alumni
American restaurateurs
George W. Bush administration personnel
United States Bureau of Indian Affairs personnel
People from Hayward, Wisconsin
Minnesota Republicans
Wisconsin Republicans